USA-154, also known as GPS IIR-6 and GPS SVN-41, is an American navigation satellite which forms part of the Global Positioning System. It was the sixth Block IIR GPS satellite to be launched, out of thirteen in the original configuration, and twenty one overall. It was built by Lockheed Martin, using the AS-4000 satellite bus.

USA-154 was launched at 17:14:02 UTC on 10 November 2000, atop a Delta II carrier rocket, flight number D281, flying in the 7925-9.5 configuration. The launch took place from Space Launch Complex 17A at the Cape Canaveral Air Force Station, and placed USA-154 into a transfer orbit. The satellite raised itself into medium Earth orbit using a Star-37FM apogee motor.

It was used to broadcast the PRN 14 signal, and operated in slot 5 of plane F of the GPS constellation.

USA-154 was initially retired on 9 July 2020. It was subsequently reactivated on 20 January 2022 and decommissioned again on 25 January 2023.

References

Spacecraft launched in 2000
Spacecraft decommissioned in 2023
GPS satellites
USA satellites